Nakhon Sawan United Football Club (Thai สโมสรฟุตบอลนครสวรรค์ ยูไนเต็ด), is a Thai football club based in Nakhon Sawan, Thailand. The club was formed in August 2017. The club is currently playing in the 2017 Thailand Amateur League Northern Region.

Record

References

External links
 
 http://daily.khaosod.co.th/view_news.php?newsid=TUROelkyc3dNakV5TURnMk1BPT0=&sectionid=TURNek5nPT0=&day=TWpBeE55MHdPQzB4TWc9PQ==
 http://www.thailive.net/2017/08/01/%E0%B8%97%E0%B8%B2%E0%B8%87%E0%B9%80%E0%B8%A5%E0%B8%B7%E0%B8%AD%E0%B8%81%E0%B9%83%E0%B8%AB%E0%B8%A1%E0%B9%88-%E0%B8%AD-%E0%B9%80%E0%B8%97%E0%B8%A7%E0%B8%B4%E0%B8%99%E0%B8%97%E0%B8%A3%E0%B9%8C/

Association football clubs established in 2016
Football clubs in Thailand
Sport in Tak province
2016 establishments in Thailand